Colias myrmidone, the Danube clouded yellow, is a butterfly in the family Pieridae.

Distribution  
It is found from Western Asia, through Southern Russia, Ukraine, Romania, Hungary up to Austria and the Jura Mountains near Regensburg in Germany.

Description 
The wingspan is 44–50 mm. The butterfly flies in May and again from July to August in two generations.

Biology 
The larvae feed on species of the flowering plant in the genus Chamaecytisus  including Chamaecytisus ratisbonensis, Chamaecytisus ruthenicus and Chamaecytisus supinus.

References

External links

 Taxonomy and photos
 Fauna Europaea

myrmidone
Butterflies described in 1780
Butterflies of Asia
Butterflies of Europe
Taxa named by Eugenius Johann Christoph Esper